Dustin Duncan is a Canadian provincial politician. He is the Saskatchewan Party member of the Legislative Assembly of Saskatchewan for the constituency of Weyburn-Big Muddy.

Elected in the June 2006 byelection at the age of 26, Dustin was named to a newly created Youth Opportunities critic portfolio by Opposition Leader Brad Wall. He is the minister responsible for the Saskatchewan Watershed Authority.
 
Raised in Halbrite, Duncan is a graduate of the Weyburn Comprehensive School and has a B.A. in History from the University of Regina.  He has also completed the Canadian Securities Course. Prior to being elected in Weyburn-Big-Muddy, he worked in the office of the Official Opposition and in the provincial Department of Health.

Duncan retained his seat in the general election held on November 7, 2007 and became the Minister of Health in the Saskatchewan Government.

In 2016, Duncan was assigned Minister of Energy and Resources and Minister responsible for SaskTel and SaskEnergy.

On November 9, 2020, Duncan was appointed Minister of Education by Premier Scott Moe.

Cabinet positions

References

1979 births
Living people
Members of the Executive Council of Saskatchewan
People from Weyburn
Saskatchewan Party MLAs
21st-century Canadian politicians
University of Regina alumni